The Bottle Houses in Prince Edward Island (PEI), also known as the symphony of color and light, was built in 1980 by Edouard Arsenault. It is made of hundreds of recycled colored glass bottles, a popular tourist site in PEI. Bottle wall construction is the process of building a structure, usually housing, with glass or plastic bottles and a binding material. This sustainable building type helps reduce the chances of bottles dumped at landfills and promotes reuse of "waste" material. The bottle houses on the Island have many benefits to the locals and visitors, such as; its aesthetic style, low cost of production to renewable resource architecture and sustainability (8).

Introduction 
Architecture today pushes the notion of creating buildings that are sustainable and resilient, whether it be by reducing non-renewable resources needed to keep the building running, using passive architectural methods to retire the use of electricity and fuel or by conserving water. Several organizations, such as Leeds, BREEAM, and Energy Star have been put in place to promote sustainability and hold designers accountable for the long-term goal of sustaining the planet for future generations. The Bottle house on Prince Edward Island- P.E.I., designed by Edward Arsenault in 1980, portrays sustainable architecture in a unique way. It promotes the use of recycled materials, glass bottles in this case, to create three resilient structures that not only create shelters but euphoric moments for the people of the community and tourists which visit the spaces.

History 
Bottle wall construction is the process of building a structure, usually housing, with glass or plastic bottles and binding material. This sustainable building type helps reduce the chances of bottles being dumped at landfills and promotes the reuse of "waste" material. Its benefits range from aesthetic style, low cost of production to renewable architecture and sustainability[ii], carrying out the three steps of effective waste management; reduce, reuse, and recycle. Bottle house construction has been present since ancient Rome, the very first was constructed by William F. Peck in Tonopah, Nevada. At the time these houses were not constructed for aesthetic purposes like they are today, they were appreciated due to their ability to reduce the load of the upper levels of houses & reduce the amount of concrete needed. The building was made with 10,000 bottles of J. Hostetter's Stomach Bitters, medicine bottles that were initially reused by being refilled with glop and resold by shady dealers. The demand for this type of vernacular architecture arose due to the short supply of construction materials and the rising population levels in the area. Peck took it upon himself to construct these buildings to tackle the housing demand-supply issue in the town, using mortar as a binding element, lime as an interior finish and the bottles as insulators to keep the homes warm in the harsh winter.

Bottle House, Prince Edward Island 
The inspiration for the Bottle House, P.E.I. was taken from another glass house in British Columbia. By 1980, Edward Arsenault had already built three of his structures which have become a tourist landmark for the locals in the Cape Egmont community. He sourced his bottles from various trash sites around him and even began to get his communities support as they began to donate their bottles to help his project. They were built from the ground up and bound with cement to form the shape of houses. As light shines through them they create kaleidoscopic patterns and stained-glass colors on the floor, creating a magical and euphoric feeling for the visitors that enter the space, as to why it's named "the symphony of color and light"

Life of Edouard Arsenault 
Edouard Arsenault, the architect of the bottle village, was born in 1914 to Emmanuel and Roseline Arsenault. He spent most of his time in Cap-Egmont before he moved to the United Kingdom to serve in the second world war. He started off as a fisherman, a protégé under his father, then he began to fix up and construct boats. In 1948 he married Rosina Leclerc who later bore his first two children; Yvette and Rejanee, they all lived in the Cap-Egmont lighthouse where he served as the resident lighthouse keeper till the lighthouse became automated, and they moved onto the grounds of the current bottle houses in P.E.I. Roseline bore two more kids; Maurice and Pierre there. During his retirement from being the Lighthouse keeper he had the vision to create the Bottle houses which consist of a six-gable house, a tavern and a chapel, however, the chapel was only completed after his death.

The glass village 
He received the inspiration to design the houses after receiving a postcard from his daughter in 1979 of a glass castle in British Columbia which she had visited. He began to collect over 25,000 recycled bottles from the community and dumps to build the spaces. After he retrieved them, he spent the winter in the basement cleaning the bottles, removing the labels, and planning the project, which he began to build in 1980 at the age of 66. The bottle house village houses a six-gabled house, tavern, chapel, gift shop and a replica of the lighthouse he worked in. The gable house was built at  using about 12,000 bottles that formed the three main sections. Arsenault carefully picked the size and colors of the bottles to create unique patterns on the building's façade as well as in the rooms when light shines through them. He built it by cementing 300 to 400 bottles per row, using about 85 bags of cement, the binding material, over a six-month period before it was finally open to the public in 1981 Then he designed the hexagon shaped tavern in 1982, later rebuilt in 1993, which only used 8,000 bottles, the harsh winter conditions called for the rebuilding of the Tavern, the initial roof and the central cylinder were able to be salvaged. The third building built was the Chapel in 1983, made with 10,000 bottles. The building during a sunset would shine colorful streams in from behind the altar, creating a feeling of peace for the guests as they take in the atmosphere of the site.

The garden and site 
The buildings sit around several Acadian gardens, trees, a pond, and bottle tree structures. It also sits by a wood carved structure of a woman's face, a local gift shop, and a miniature replica of the lighthouse Arsenault tended to before his retirement. Apart from constructing the buildings Arsenault carried out the gardening and landscaping on the site. He spent his time after retiring planting trees on the site, laying out the stonework and designing the flower beds. His Acadian roots prompted his commitment to developing the Cap-Egmont, Evangeline area; he dedicated his retirement to designing artefacts that made his home community special and unique, "radiating a symphony of sunlight-powered colors in a tranquil garden setting with a goldfish pond and a fountain" to create a space for tourists to enjoy nature and the serene sounds of the water. The views captured from the site are of the ocean, and a mini replica of the Cape-Egmont Lighthouse that he tended.

Construction process 
The bottles were sourced from various trash sites around the town and from the community as they began to donate their own bottles to help the project. They were built from the ground up, bound with cement to form the shape of houses. As light shines through them they create kaleidoscopic patterns and stained glass colors on the cement floor, creating a magical and euphoric feeling for the visitors that enter the space, as to why it's named "the symphony of color and light".

Advantages of vernacular architecture 
The bottle wall or bottle house technique provides various advantages for the glass houses, sustainability, aesthetics, cost-effective waste management, and bulletproof. In terms of aesthetics the bottle house construction is beneficial for a small community like the Cape-Egmont community, it becomes a unique attraction which brings in tourists and improves the GDP of the country. Its structural components consist of the binder, typically a motor or clay and glass bottles making them structurally sound and stable and can resist bullet shots. Cost-effective waste management- millions of water and wine bottles are discarded yearly into landfills so reusing this material turns these discarded bottles into eco bricks which save cost and reduce the levels of energy that is consumed producing concrete. Arsenault's artefacts brought life and a personality to the city bringing its locals and visitors together to witness a unique and significant moment, the bottle house village. The building is not only effective for its sustainable qualities but the site as well which promotes healthy living within nature as well as taking care of your environment and the community.

References 

Wikipedia Student Program
Bottle houses